Roscoe Bay Provincial Park is a provincial park in British Columbia, Canada, comprising the southeast portion of West Redonda Island, facing Desolation Sound and Waddington Channel.

References

Provincial Parks of the Discovery Islands
Provincial parks of British Columbia
1989 establishments in British Columbia
Protected areas established in 1989